Gilles Dauvé (pen name Jean Barrot; born 1947) is a French political theorist, school teacher, and translator associated with left communism and the contemporary tendency of communization.

Biography 
In collaboration with other left communists such as François Martin and Karl Nesic, Dauvé has attempted to fuse, critique, and develop different left communist currents, most notably the Italian movement associated with Amadeo Bordiga (and its heretical journal Invariance), German-Dutch council communism, and the French perspectives associated with Socialisme ou Barbarie and the Situationist International. He has focused on theoretical discussions of economic issues concerning the controversial failure of Second International, Marxism (including both Social Democracy and Leninist Communism), the global revolutionary upsurge of the 1960s and its subsequent dissolution, and on developments in global capitalist accumulation and class struggle.

Among English-speaking communists and anarchists, Dauvé is best known for his Eclipse and Re-emergence of the Communist Movement, first published by Black & Red Press (Detroit, Michigan) in 1974 and Critique of the Situationist International, first published in Red Eye, Berkeley, California. An essay from the first pamphlet, and the whole of the second article, were reprinted by Unpopular Books in London as What is Communism (1983) and What is Situationism respectively, in 1987. The first pamphlet was reprinted with a new foreword in 1997 by Antagonism (London). These articles develop Bordiga's critique of Second International productivism in light of Marx's writings on formal and real subsumption and the global uprisings of 1968, and theory of communization by drawing on council communist and Situationist traditions.

Dauvé also participated in the journal La Banquise, which he edited with Karl Nesic and others from 1983 to 1986. This sought to develop the new communist program suggested in Le Mouvement Communiste through a critical appraisal of post-1968 radical politics, including Situationist and autonomist experiments. It also developed the theory of society's real subsumption into capital.

More recently, Dauvé, along with Nesic and others, has published the irregular journal Troploin, featuring articles on the collapse of both Leninist and Keynesian regimes of accumulation and the transition to "globalized" neoliberal expansion, the Middle Eastern conflicts, September 11, and the rhetoric and logic of the War on Terrorism. Many have been translated into English by Dauvé himself and are archived on the Troploin website.

Bibliography

In English 
 Eclipse and Re-emergence of the Communist Movement Jean Barrot et François Martin (alias de François Cerutti), Black & Red Press (Detroit, Michigan), 1974.
 , 1979
 
 and the S.I.? (originally published in La Banquise, no. 4, 1986)
 The Perplexities of the Middle Eastern Conflict
 Grey September (on the issues raised after September 11, 2001, with Carasso and Nesic)
 Back to the Situationist International
 From Crisis to Communisation (PM Press, 2019)

In French 
 Jean Barrot, Champ Libre, 1972.
 Jean Barrot, La Tête de feuilles, 1972.
 Jean Barrot, Payot, 1976.
 Jean Barrot, Paris, U.G.E. 10/18, 1979.( téléchargeable cf. liens externes)
 Collectif, préf. Gilles Perrault, ill. Tony Johannot, contributions de Pierre Rabcor, François-Georges Lavacquerie, Serge Quadruppani, Gilles Dauvé, en annexe :  Les Ennemis de nos ennemis ne sont pas forcément nos amis (mai 1992), Paris, Réflex, 1996.
 Gilles Dauvé, HB Éditions, 1997
 Gilles Dauvé, ADEL, 1999
 Denis Authier, Gilles Dauvé, Les Nuits rouges, 2003
 Gilles Dauvé, Karl Nesic, L'Harmattan, 2009

See also 
 Communization

References

External links 
 
 Gilles Dauvé Library (Libcom.org archive of Dauvé best-known English texts)
 Jean Barrot (John Gray's archive of earlier French, English, Italian, and German pieces)

1947 births
Living people
Council communists
French anti-capitalists
French communists
French journalists
French male essayists
French male writers
Left communists
Marxist theorists